Gypsy Girl is a British TV series.

Gypsy Girl may also refer to:

Gypsy Girl (Loir song), from the album "Autumn Flow" 
Gypsy Girl (mosaic), a mosaic uncovered in the ancient city of Zeugma
Gypsy Girl, the US title of Sky West and Crooked
Gypsy Girl, alternate title of The Diddakoi
"Gypsy Girl", a song by Everyday Sunday, from the album Anthems for the Imperfect (2004)
The Gypsy Girl, a painting by Frans Hals